Luke Lennon-Ford (born 5 May 1989) is a British born sprinter competing for Ireland who specialises in the 400 metres. He is coached by Linford Christie. Prior to 2017, Lennon-Ford ran for his birthplace, Great Britain

At the 2011 European Athletics U23 Championships he won bronze in the 400 metres and gold in the 4 x 400 metres relay.
He was selected in the 2012 Olympic team for the 4 x 400 metre relay, but did not run in the heats or the final.

References

External links

1989 births
Living people
Sportspeople from Sutton Coldfield
English male sprinters
British male sprinters
Black British sportspeople
English sportspeople of Ghanaian descent
World Athletics Indoor Championships medalists